Eskimo Point is a flat-topped, steep-sided promontory which protrudes from the east side of Eisenhower Range and forms the north wall of O'Kane Canyon, in Victoria Land.

So named by the Southern Party of the New Zealand Geological Survey Antarctic Expedition (NZGSAE), 1962–63, which camped on its upper surface and built an igloo while waiting for white-out conditions to lift.

References 

Headlands of Victoria Land